Edmund Ritter von Hellmer (12 November 1850, Vienna – 9 March 1935, Vienna), born Edmund Hellmer and ennobled in 1912, was an Austrian sculptor who worked in the styles of Historicism and Art Nouveau.

Life 
Hellmer studied architecture at the Polytechnikum in Vienna. At the same time, he received his first artistic training from his uncle, the sculptor Josef Schönfeld. In 1866, Hellmer decided to study sculpture full-time at the Academy of Fine Arts Vienna. While there, he also worked in the studio of Hanns Gasser, who helped him to finance a short stay in Paris. In 1869, at the age of 19, he presented a statue of Prometheus at the International Art Exhibition in Munich. He won a prize that included a scholarship, enabling him to spend almost two years in Italy.

In 1870, he returned to Vienna and worked as a freelance sculptor. In 1879, he was appointed a Professor at the Academy and, from 1882 to 1892, was a member of the faculty there. Emil Fuchs was one of Hellmer's most prominent students. In 1897, he was one of the founders of the Vienna Secession. From 1901 to 1922 he was an associate dean, then a full dean at the Academy. During the last year of his life, he was confined to a wheelchair.

Major works 
 Franz Joseph I Gives His People a Constitution, Pediment at the Austrian Parliament Building, 1879
 Schindler Monument in the Stadtpark, Vienna. Marble, 1895
 Die Macht zu Lande (The Forces on Land), fountain at the Hofburg in Vienna. Marble, 1897
 Goethe Monument, at the Opera Ring in Vienna. Bronze, 1900.
 Empress Elisabeth Monument, Salzburg, 1901
 Castalia Fountain at the University of Vienna, 1910
 Johann Strauß Monument in the Stadtpark, Vienna. Bronze with marble reliefs, 1921
 Grave statues for Hans Makart (1889), Nikolaus Dumba (1903) and Hugo Wolf (1904), among many others.

References

Further reading 
 .
 
 Barbara Scheiblin: Die Sepulkralplastik Edmund Hellmers. Diplomarbeit. Universität Wien, Wien 1988.
 Felix Czeike: Historisches Lexikon Wien. Band 3: Ha – La. Kremayr & Scheriau, Wien 1994, .
 Barbara Scheiblin: Sisi in Salzburg. Das Kaiserin-Elisabeth-Denkmal von Edmund Hellmer. In: Salzburg-Archiv. Band 26.1999, . Verein Freunde der Salzburger Geschichte (Hrsg.), Salzburg 1999, .

External links 
 
 Edmund von Hellmer, Wiener Goethe-Denkmal, 1900
 Entry for Edmund von Hellmer on the Union List of Artist Names

Austrian male sculptors
Artists from Vienna
1850 births
1935 deaths
Art Nouveau sculptors
Members of the Vienna Secession
20th-century Austrian sculptors
19th-century sculptors
19th-century Austrian male artists
20th-century Austrian male artists